Lisa de Londres (  1220–1250) was a trobairitz, a female composer in Old Occitan. Her work is known only from three lines quoted in Italian translation in the Reggimento e costumi di donna of Francesco da Barberino (died 1348), who also mentions her in his Documenti d'amore. The three lines are:

It is unclear what kind of poem the three lines are taken from, perhaps a tenso, an ensenhamen or a cobla esparsa. In a tenso with Hugolin  de  Forcalquier, the Comtessa de Dia seems to allude to this poem by Lisa. In the Commentario of his Documenti, Barberino gives a Latin summary of a six-stanza tenso between Lisa (now called domina Lysa) and Felip Engles on courtly love. From the Latin summaries alone, the work appears "masterful" (meisterliche), according to Angelica Rieger.

Saverio Guida and Gerardo Larghi tentatively identified Lisa with Salvatja de Londra, who judged a partimen between Lanfranc Cigala and Lantelm. Antoine Thomas suggested that Lisa was the same person as Auliane de Anglia, mentioned elsewhere by Barberino.

"Londres" has sometimes been taken to refer to London (as in Friedrich Christian Diez), partially on the basis that her interlocutor's name, Felip Engles, means "Philip the Englishman". It more likely refers to a place in southern France. Locations in Hérault, Gard, Bouches-du-Rhône and Lot-et-Garonne have been suggested. Rieger opts for Saint-Martin-de-Londres.

Notes

Bibliography

Trobairitz
13th-century French women